Barbalha Futebol Clube, commonly known as Barbalha, is a Brazilian football club based in Barbalha, Ceará state.

History
The club was founded on January 1, 2002. They won the Campeonato Cearense Third Level in 2007.

Achievements
 Campeonato Cearense Third Level:
 Winners (1): 2007

Stadium
Barbalha Futebol Clube play their home games at Estádio Lírio Callou, nicknamed Inaldão. The stadium has a maximum capacity of 3,000 people.

References

Association football clubs established in 2002
Football clubs in Ceará
2002 establishments in Brazil